Blodeuwedd (Welsh "Flower-Faced", a composite name from blodau "flowers" + gwedd "face"), is the wife of Lleu Llaw Gyffes in Welsh mythology. She was made from the flowers of broom, meadowsweet and oak by the magicians Math and Gwydion, and is a central figure in Math fab Mathonwy, the last of the Four Branches of the Mabinogi.

Role in Welsh tradition
 
The hero Lleu Llaw Gyffes has been placed under a tynged ("doom") by his mother, Arianrhod, that he may never have a human wife. To counteract this curse, the magicians Math and Gwydion:

Some time later, while Lleu is away on business, Blodeuwedd has an affair with Gronw Pebr, the lord of Penllyn, and the two lovers conspire to murder Lleu. Blodeuwedd tricks Lleu into revealing how he may be killed, since he cannot be killed during the day or night, nor indoors or outdoors, neither riding nor walking, not clothed and not naked, nor by any weapon lawfully made. He reveals to her that he can only be killed at dusk, wrapped in a net, with one foot on a bath and one on a black goat, by a riverbank and by a spear forged for a year during the hours when everyone is at Mass.  With this information she arranges his death.

Struck by the spear thrown by Gronw's hand, Lleu transforms into an eagle and flies away. Gwydion tracks him down and finds him perched high on an oak tree. Through the singing of an englyn (known as englynion Gwydion) Gwydion lures Lleu down from the oak tree and switches him back to his human form. Gwydion and Math nurse Lleu back to health before mustering Gwynedd and reclaiming his lands from Gronw and Blodeuwedd.

Gwydion overtakes the fleeing Blodeuwedd and turns her into an owl (in Welsh tylluan or gwdihŵ), the creature hated by all other birds, proclaiming:

The narrative adds:

Meanwhile, Gronw escapes to Penllyn and sends emissaries to Lleu, to beg his forgiveness. Lleu refuses, demanding that Gronw must stand on the bank of the River Cynfael and receive a blow from his spear. Gronw desperately asks if anyone from his warband will take the spear in his place, but his men refuse his plea. Eventually, Gronw agrees to receive the blow on the condition that he may place a large stone between himself and Lleu. Lleu allows Gronw to do so, then throws the spear with such strength that it pierces the stone, killing his rival. A holed stone in Ardudwy is still known as Llech Ronw (Gronw's Stone).

Robert Graves and others consider lines 142–153 of Cad Goddeu to be a "Song of Blodeuwedd".

In literature
Alan Garner's novel, The Owl Service (1967), makes the story of Blodeuwedd an eternal cycle played out each generation, in a Welsh valley. The only way to break the cycle is for the Blodeuwedd character to realise she is supposed to be flowers, not an owl.
Louise M. Hewett explores the story of Blodeuwedd and Math Son of Mathonwy from a feminist perspective in the second and third books, Wind (2017); and Flowers (2017), of her novel series, Pictish Spirit. Within the novels, a discussion about the three significant females in the story of Math Son of Mathonwy – Goewin, Arianrhod and Blodeuwedd – has taken place between Róisín and a group of the Pictish Spirit Braves. It culminates with Róisín's "re-vision" of the story in the closing chapter of Flowers, pages 810–814.
Blodeuwedd's creation by Gwydion and Math is delicately described in the poem "The Wife of Llew" by Francis Ledwidge.
The Blodeuwedd story is referenced in the novel and film Tylluan Wen.
In John Cowper Powys's novel Porius: A Romance of the Dark Ages (1951), where the adulterous Blodeuwedd "is released from her prison of beak and feathers" by the magic of King Arthur's magician Myrddin (Merlin).

In popular culture
John Steinbeck's Sweet Thursday (1954) mentions Blodeuwedd's story briefly. Doc tells Suzy of the story, as he looks at the wild iris in her hand, while they're on their arranged date.
In the Welsh TV series Y Gwyll (Hinterland), season 1, episode 4: "The Girl in the Water", murder victim Alice Thomas leaves a journal indicating she that saw herself as Blodeuwedd. When interviewing the professor who had broken off his and Alice's affair the night she was killed, DCI Tom Mathias reads passages of the story and notes the story's multiple interpretations.
In The Return: Shadow Souls, the sixth book of L. J. Smith's The Vampire Diaries series, Lady Blodeuwedd resides in the Dark Dimension and is an aristocrat.
The story of Blodeuwedd is explained in the young adult fantasy novel Inkheart (2003), as an example of a story not ending as expected.
One episode of the Canadian children's television series MythQuest involves a lead character taking the place of Blodeuwedd and actually getting away with the murder, before realizing that she has changed not only the outcome of the story, but every aspect of reality that was built on the historical significance of the myth. She then makes the effort to restore the fate of both Blodeuwedd and Gronw.

Notes

Welsh mythology
Women in mythology
Mythological birds of prey
Adultery